The 2013–14 season was Fulham's 116th professional season and their 13th consecutive season in the top flight of English football, the Premier League. They also competed in the League Cup and the FA Cup. Fulham were relegated from the Premier League, finishing in 19th place. They also exited the League Cup in the fourth round and the FA Cup in the fourth round.

Transfers

In

Loans in

Out

Loans out

Overall transfer activity
For the purposes of this totaliser, Frei's fee has been converted into pounds and rounded to two significant figures.

Spending
Summer:  £8,800,000

Winter:  £11,000,000

Total:  £19,800,000

Income
Summer:  £0

Winter:  £2,500,000

Total:  £2,500,000

Total
Summer:  £8,800,000

Winter:  £8,500,000

Grand Total:  £17,300,000

Fixtures and results

Pre-season

Premier League

Football League Cup

FA Cup

Competitions

Overall

Premier League table

Results summary

Results by matchday

Squad statistics

Appearances and goals
Last updated 11 May 2014

|-
|colspan="14"|Out on loan

|-
|colspan="14"|Left Permanently

|}

Top scorers
Includes all competitive matches. The list is sorted by squad number when total goals are equal.

Last updated on 11 May 2014

Disciplinary record
Includes all competitive matches. The list is sorted by shirt number.

Suspensions

References

Fulham F.C. seasons
Fulham